Antonio "Toni" Doblas Santana (born 5 August 1980) is a Spanish former footballer who played as a goalkeeper.

He spent the better part of his professional career with Betis, appearing in 95 competitive matches and winning one Copa del Rey. He also had several spells with Xerez and Zaragoza.

Club career

Spain
Born in Bellavista, Seville, Doblas spent four seasons with local Real Betis's B-team, where he was the undisputed starter before moving on loan to Andalusian neighbours Xerez CD. He made only four appearances in the second division and returned to Betis' first side the year after, being called into immediate main-squad action due to injuries to Pedro Contreras and Toni Prats.

Doblas made his La Liga debut against Getafe CF on 24 October 2004, in a 2–0 away win. He remained a starter for the remainder of the campaign, taking part in the 2005 Copa del Rey final against CA Osasuna which Betis won 2–1; in the competition's semi-final second leg against Athletic Bilbao he saved two penalties in a shootout and, in August 2005, he signed his first professional contract at already 25.

Doblas was also a key element in Betis' first-ever qualification to the UEFA Champions League, as he saved a Camel Meriem penalty against AS Monaco FC in the third qualify round, a 3–2 win. During the league season errors cost him his position, regained by Contreras: his most notable mistake came against Chelsea at Stamford Bridge, when he gave Ricardo Carvalho a goal in an eventual 0–4 Champions League loss; he still managed 24 league appearances, a situation repeated (also with Contreras as backup) in the 2006–07 campaign.

Midway through 2007–08, Doblas suffered a serious injury in a friendly that kept him out of action for five months – he was supposed to battle for first-choice status with new signing Ricardo. He was reinstated in the squad in late April, donning nº 25 after teammate Rafael Sobis switched to 21; in June 2008 he was released by Betis and, on 1 September, joined second level side Real Zaragoza, meeting the same fate at the end of the season.

On 8 September 2009, Doblas was supposed to sign for Aris Thessaloniki F.C. in Greece for one year, joining a squad with three other countrymen and with Donato who played in Spain for 15 years as assistant manager; eventually, the deal fell through and he returned to Spain, moving to SD Huesca in early November.

Doblas returned to Zaragoza on 9 July 2010, signing a two-year deal with an option to a third season. In the following off-season, after having shared first-choice duties with Leo Franco as the club narrowly avoided top level relegation, he was loaned to another former club, Xerez.

Abroad / Later years
In January 2013, Doblas signed an 18-month contract with Azerbaijan Premier League side FK Khazar Lankaran. Six months later, following an 0–8 home defeat to Maccabi Haifa F.C. in the UEFA Europa League's second qualifying round, he was one of four players to have their contracts terminated.

On 27 February 2014, Doblas moved to Serie A's S.S.C. Napoli for four months, as the Rafael Benítez-led team had several problems in the goalkeeper position, most notably Rafael Cabral who suffered a season-ending injury. On 12 August he changed clubs and countries again, signing with Helsingin Jalkapalloklubi as a short-term replacement for Michael Tørnes.

In November 2014, Doblas became involved in a match-fixing investigation surrounding the 21 May 2011 fixture between Zaragoza and Levante UD. On 29 August of the following year, following a brief spell back in his country with lowly UE Cornellà, he signed for Indian Super League franchise Delhi Dynamos FC.

Until his retirement, Doblas represented in quick succession CD Toledo, Delhi Dynamos again, Extremadura UD and CD San Fernando. In December 2017, the 37-year-old moved to Ceres–Negros F.C. of the Philippines Football League, with the deal being made effective at the start of the 2018 season.

Personal life
Still during his career, Doblas majored in journalism.

Club statistics

Honours
Betis
Copa del Rey: 2004–05

Napoli
Coppa Italia: 2013–14

HJK
Veikkausliiga: 2014
Finnish Cup: 2014

References

External links

Betisweb stats and bio 

1980 births
Living people
Footballers from Seville
Spanish footballers
Association football goalkeepers
La Liga players
Segunda División players
Segunda División B players
Tercera División players
Betis Deportivo Balompié footballers
Real Betis players
Xerez CD footballers
Real Zaragoza players
SD Huesca footballers
UE Cornellà players
CD Toledo players
Extremadura UD footballers
Azerbaijan Premier League players
Khazar Lankaran FK players
Serie A players
S.S.C. Napoli players
Veikkausliiga players
Helsingin Jalkapalloklubi players
Indian Super League players
Odisha FC players
Ceres–Negros F.C. players
Spanish expatriate footballers
Expatriate footballers in Azerbaijan
Expatriate footballers in Italy
Expatriate footballers in Finland
Expatriate footballers in India
Expatriate footballers in the Philippines
Spanish expatriate sportspeople in Azerbaijan
Spanish expatriate sportspeople in Italy
Spanish expatriate sportspeople in Finland
Spanish expatriate sportspeople in India
Spanish expatriate sportspeople in the Philippines